Army commissar 1st rank, was a political rank in the Soviet Red Army, equivalent to the military rank of Komandarm 1st rank, and comparable to NATO OF-9.

Appointment

1935
Appointment to Army Comissar 1st rank as to the disposal of the Central Executive Committee of the Soviet Union and the Council of People's Commissars (CPC) from November 20, 1935:
Yan Gamarnik (1894–1937), committed suicide to avoid arrest

1937
Pyotr Smirnov (1897–1939), as to CPC disposal December 20, 1937; arrested June 1938 and later executed

1939
Lev Mekhlis (1889–1953), as to CPC disposal February 8, 1939
Efim Shchadenko (1885–1951)

1941 
Alexander Zaporozhets (1899–1959)
Military ranks of the Soviet Union